Water Planet is a Polish television channel owned by Polcast Television, which broadcasts programmes about sea and tourism. It was launched on May 14, 2012 and replaced CSB TV.

Television channels in Poland
Television channels and stations established in 2012